Zemira is an opera seria in three acts by Francesco Bianchi. The libretto was by Gaetano Sertor. 

Zemira like other works by Bianchi, was innovative. As Marita P. McClymonds explains, "Unusual components in this work are the opening trio with storm music, the short duet for two men, the programmatic battle music, the extensive quartet . . .  The version for Naples features extensive use of clarinets . . . available there some ten years earlier than in other Italian cities."

Performance history
The opera was first performed at the Teatro di San Carlo in Naples on 4  November 1781. It was revised for the Teatro Nuovo in Padua probably on 13 June 1786, this time omitting the introduzione and the scene of the stabbing of Zemira.

Roles

Synopsis
The Emperor Akbar tries to win Zemira in the face of determined opposition from her father, Sarabes, and her intended husband, Gandarte. Ultimately Zemira is stabbed to death by her father, and Akbar pardons Gandarte.

References

McClymonds, Marita P (1992), 'Zemira' in The New Grove Dictionary of Opera, ed. Stanley Sadie (London) 

Opera seria
Operas by Francesco Bianchi
1781 operas
Italian-language operas
Operas